The Avco World Trophy, also known as the Avco Cup, is the playoff championship trophy of the defunct World Hockey Association (1972–1979). The trophy's naming rights were sold to the former Avco Corporation (a name originally derived from "Aviation Company"), a defense contractor who bought the rights to advertise their consumer finance division. The trophy was mocked by some for its corporate sponsorship and never developed anything approaching the significance and sentiment of the Stanley Cup, its National Hockey League rival. Still, the cup's design was often seen as creative in that it involved a freely-floating etched crystal globe embedded in the "stem" of the cup. The cup was designed by Frank Bonnerkopf of Boise, Idaho.

The trophy was donated to the new league in 1972 along with approximately $500,000 by the Avco Financial Services Corporation, and became the first major sports league championship trophy to bear the name of a private corporation. Three Avco trophies exist; besides the one that is on display at the Hockey Hall of Fame, the others are in Winnipeg at the Manitoba Sports Hall of Fame and Museum, and in the Nova Scotia Sports Hall of Fame in Halifax. The trophy was retired after the WHA ceased operations in 1979. The Bobby Hull–led Jets claimed the trophy on three occasions including the final league championship against Wayne Gretzky and the Edmonton Oilers. Gordie Howe and the Houston Aeros vied for the trophy three times and won it twice.

The Avco Trophy in fact may have been most famous, or perhaps infamous, in its absence. When the New England Whalers won the league's inaugural championship in 1973 the trophy had not yet been completed, and the Whalers were forced to skate their divisional championship trophy around the ice surface.

Champions and finalists

References

World Hockey Association trophies and awards